The following is a complete list of films produced and/or distributed by American production and distribution company Dimension Films, a subsidiary of Lantern Entertainment,  formerly owned by The Walt Disney Company under Miramax, and later by The Weinstein Company. Dimension Films began in 1992, and has produced and distributed numerous genre films, largely horror, sci-fi and action films. The company has owned the rights to, as well as produced and distributed, the films of several horror franchises, including the Scream films, the Children of the Corn series, Hellraiser series and the Halloween films, among others. 

All films through October 1, 2005, are currently owned by Paramount Pictures via Miramax while all films since October 1, 2005, are currently owned by Lantern Entertainment and Lionsgate via Spyglass Media Group.

In addition to distributing films for theatrical release, Dimension Films also released numerous titles direct-to-video. In 2008, the company introduced the Dimension Extreme division, a DVD label for "extreme" cinema, which mainly consisted of domestic and international horror titles.

1990s

2000s

2010s

Television productions

See also 
 Dimension Films
 The Weinstein Company
 Miramax Films

References

Works cited 

 
 
 
 
 
 
  
 

 
American films by studio
Lists of films by studio
Lists of Paramount Pictures films